Thomas Enqvist was the defending champion, but lost in the quarterfinals this year.

Jacco Eltingh won the tournament, beating Chuck Adams in the final, 6–3, 6–4.

Seeds

Draw

Finals

Top half

Bottom half

External links
 Main draw

Men's Singles